Scopula oxysticha is a moth of the  family Geometridae. It is found in China (Yunnan).

References

Moths described in 1938
oxysticha
Moths of Asia